Marǧúmay  is the name of the tenth month of the Afghan calendar. It occurs in the winter season, from December 21/22 to January 19/20. It has 30 days.

Marǧúmay corresponds with the tropical Zodiac sign Capricorn. Marǧúmay literally means markhor or a wild goat in Pashto.

Observances 
 Christmas Eve - 3 or 4 Marǧūmay
 Christmas - 4 or 5 Marǧūmay, celebrated by Christians of Afghan descent or within Afghanistan who use the Gregorian Calendar (Georgian date: December 25)
 Boxing Day - 5 or 6 Marǧūmay
 Traditional Epiphany and Armenian Christmas - 16 or 17 Dey
 Ethiopian Christmas - 17 or 18 Marǧūmay
 Feast of the Baptism of the Lord - 23 Marǧūmay (Traditional), fourth Sunday of Marǧūmay (modern)
 Traditional Epiphany (Julian Calendar) - 29 or 30 Marǧūmay

For those countries that observe Epiphany on the first Sunday of January following the New Year, the Solar Hijri date falls as the third Sunday of Marǧūmay.

Pashto names for the months of the Solar Hijri calendar

ps:مرغومی(مياشت)